Hodierna is a feminine given name and a family name.

Hodierna may also refer to:

 Giovanni Batista Hodierna, astronomer (1597–1660)
 Suecia Antiqua et Hodierna ("Ancient and Modern Sweden"), a work of engravings collected by Erik Dahlberg in the middle of the 17th century. 
 Hodierna of Tripoli, countess of Tripoli
 Hodierna of St Albans, mother of Alexander Neckam and wet nurse to Richard I of England
 21047 Hodierna